Javier Castro Urdín (born 8 January 2000) is a Spanish footballer who plays as a central defender for AD Alcorcón.

Club career
Born in Madrid, Castro joined Rayo Vallecano's youth setup in 2015, from CD Canillas. On 25 July 2019, after finishing his formation, he signed for AD Alcorcón and was immediately assigned to the reserves in the Tercera División.

Castro made his senior debut on 25 August 2019, starting in a 1–0 Tercera División away win against Fútbol Alcobendas Sport. His first team debut came the following 26 January, after coming on as a late substitute for injured Paris Adot in a 3–1 home win against SD Ponferradina in the Segunda División.

On 23 June 2021, Castro renewed his contract with Alkor until 2025. On 27 July, he was loaned to Primera División RFEF side Celta de Vigo B, for one year.

References

External links
AD Alcorcón profile 

2000 births
Living people
Footballers from Madrid
Spanish footballers
Association football defenders
Segunda División players
Primera Federación players
Tercera División players
AD Alcorcón B players
AD Alcorcón footballers
Celta de Vigo B players